The war on terror is the U.S.-led international military campaign. It may also refer to the following:

 Counter-terrorism, policies and efforts by various countries
 Russian Empire's crackdown on the Anarchist Wave of the nihilist movement
 British policies during the period of anti-imperialism
 Spain's opposition to ETA and its allies
 Russian nickname in the media of the Chechen–Russian conflict
 Chinese crackdown on the Xinjiang insurgency

Media and art
 War on Terror (film), Austrian documentary film
 War on Terror (game), board game